The Ala-Buga (also Алабуга) is a left tributary of the Naryn in Naryn Region of Kyrgyzstan. The river is known as Arpa in upper reaches until confluence with the Bychan. The Ala-Buga is formed on the north slopes of the Torugart Too range and the south slopes of the Jaman Too mountains.

Settlements located along the banks of Ala-Buga include Kosh-Döbö, Jerge-Tal and Kongorchok.

References 

Rivers of Kyrgyzstan